Undercover is an extended play (EP) by the Australian indie pop band Sheppard, released independently on 1 December 2017.

Track listing

Release history

References

2017 EPs
Indie pop EPs
Synth-pop EPs
EPs by Australian artists
Sheppard (band) albums